The 2022 Summit League women's basketball tournament was a post-season women's basketball tournament for the Summit League. The tournament took place March 5–8, 2022, at the Denny Sanford Premier Center in Sioux Falls, South Dakota. The top eight teams in the final conference standings qualified for the tournament.

Seeds
The top eight teams by conference record in the Summit League are eligible to compete in the conference tournament. Teams are to be seeded by record within the conference, with a tiebreaker system to seed teams with identical conference records.

Reference:

Schedule and results

Bracket

Reference:

All-Tournament team
The following players were named to the All-Tournament team:

References

2021–22 Summit League women's basketball season
Summit League women's basketball tournament